The Ministry of Petroleum and Natural Gas (MOP&NG) is a ministry of the government of India responsible for the exploration, production, refining, distribution, marketing, import, export, and conservation of petroleum, natural gas, petroleum products, and liquefied natural gas in the country. The ministry is headed by the Cabinet Minister Hardeep Singh Puri. M. M. Kutty is the Secretary of the Ministry.

Areas of work 

Exploration and exploitation of petroleum resources, including natural gas.
Production, supply distribution, marketing and pricing of petroleum including natural gas and petroleum products.
Oil refineries, including Lube plants.
Additives for petroleum and petroleum products.
Lube blending and greases.
Planning, development and control of, and assistance to all industries dealt with by the Ministry.
All attached or subordinate offices or other organisations concerned with any of the subject specified in this list.
Planning, development and regulation of oilfield services.
Public sector projects falling under the subjects included in this list,
Engineers India limited and IBP Company. together with its subsidiaries, except such projects as are specifically allotted to any other Ministry/Dept,
Administration of various Central laws relating to Petroleum and Natural Gas

List of ministers

List of Ministers of State

Central Public Sector Undertakings
The ministry has ownership over these eight central public sector undertakings of the government of India.
Balmer Lawrie
Bharat Petroleum
Engineers India
GAIL (India) Limited
Indian Oil Corporation
Oil India
Oil and Natural Gas Corporation
Beicco Lawrie

Research Institute

Rajiv Gandhi Institute of Petroleum Technology 

RGIPT is a training and education institute that gives technical and management training to the petroleum industry and was formally opened in July 2008. The Ministry of Petroleum and Natural Gas (MOP&NG), Government of India founded the institute through an Act of Parliament ("Rajiv Gandhi Institute of Petroleum Technology Act 2007").

Campuses
 Jais Campus: Started academic sessions in June 2008 at a temporary campus at Rae Bareli. On 15 October 2016, the institute moved from temporary campus to the permanent campus at Jais.
 Noida Campus: Besides main center at Jais, Amethi, the RGIPT also have this campus for MBA and related courses.
 Assam Campus: New campus is under construction at Sivasagar, Assam. In consonance with the charter of RGIPT, the primary objective of the Assam Center of RGIPT is envisaged to offer programmes of education and training of skilled technical manpower at the diploma and advance diploma levels including B.Sc. - M.Sc. integrated courses in various areas in the domain of the petroleum sector as per requirements of the oil, gas and petrochemical industry. On 13 May 2017, Chief Minister of Assam Sarbananda Sonowal and Minister of Petroleum and Natural Gas Shri Dharmendra Pradhan jointly launched the full swing construction work of second campus at Sivasagar, Assam.
 Bangalore Campus: In July 2013, Karnataka government agreed to offer 200 acres of land to set up the Bangalore centre which is going to be the Asia's first centre on fire and safety for oil and gas sector. The institute will start functioning from 2018-19 academic year and it is purely for research in energy policy and science and technology as it is related to petroleum and energy. The institute coming up will cost Rs.1,000 crore.

Indian Institute of Petroleum and Energy

Pandit Deendayal Energy University

Controversies 
On 20 February 2015, a group of seven Indian petroleum ministry and oil firm employees were arrested for allegedly stealing and leaking classified documents to energy companies in exchange for cash payments. The group stole, photocopied and leaked confidential oil ministry documents related to energy pricing and policy in exchange for undisclosed sums of money. They were apprehended when Delhi Police received a tip that the men were trying to break into offices at the ministry.

See also

Electricity sector in India
Nuclear power in India
 Oil Industry Safety Directorate
 Oil and gas industry in India
Solar power in India
Wind power in India
Renewable energy in India

References

External links

 
Fossil fuels in India
Petroleum and Natural Gas
Government agencies for energy (India)
India